Rabbi Eliyahu Hasid (born 12 November 1976) is an Israeli politician. He briefly served as a member of the Knesset for the United Torah Judaism alliance in 2020.

Biography
Hasid was placed ninth on the United Torah Judaism list for the April 2019 elections, but UTJ won only eight seats. He was placed ninth again for the September 2019 elections, in which UTJ were reduced to seven seats. Although he missed out again in the March 2020 elections, in which he retained ninth place and UTJ again won seven seats, he entered the Knesset on 24 June 2020 as a replacement for Yaakov Litzman, who had resigned his seat under the Norwegian Law after being appointed to the cabinet. However, he resigned from the Knesset in October 2020 to allow Eliyahu Baruchi to take his seat.

References

External links

1976 births
Living people
People from Bnei Brak
Israeli Orthodox rabbis
Agudat Yisrael politicians
United Torah Judaism politicians
Members of the 23rd Knesset (2020–2021)
Rabbinic members of the Knesset